Sydney Harbour's first ferries were sail and/or oar powered, but by the mid-19th century, paddle steamers were well established. Double-ended ferries became common as they did not require turning at terminating wharves in Sydney's busy but narrow bays, including at the main hub at Circular Quay. Double-ended ferries, however, provided technological challenges for screw (propeller) propulsion and Sydney's shift from paddle steamers to screw ferries in the closing years of the nineteenth century was relatively late. Diesel power first came to Sydney Harbour ferries mainly through the conversion of existing steam ferries to diesel in the 1930s and the 1950s, when during the slow post-Bridge decades ferry companies could generally not afford new ferries. Hydrofoils were introduced to the Manly run in the 1960s and 1970s halving travel times for those willing to pay a premium fare. Government investment in new vessels during the 1970s and 1980s saw the replacement of the surviving early twentieth century vessels. New vessels included modern Lady-class ferries, four large Manly ferries, and nine First-Fleet ferries. The most recent decades have seen the introduction of the RiverCats, JetCats, SuperCats, Emerald-class ferries and River-class ferries. Apart from the three Manly "Freshwater-class" ferries, the current Sydney Ferries fleet comprises all catamarans.

See also
Timeline of Sydney Harbour ferries

Notes

References
 
 
 
 
 

Ferry transport in Sydney
Sydney Harbour ferries
Sydney-related lists
Sydney Harbour
Ferries of New South Wales